Christian Roth (born in Hanover, Germany) is a designer of luxury spectacles.

Early life
Roth is the son to Dr. Fritz-Jürgen and Sabine Roth, geb. von Prittwitz und Gaffron, and recalls receiving a pair of Ray-Bans from his father at age 14 as a defining moment in discovering his passion for eyewear.

In 1980, Roth started his career in New York as an assistant to the late fashion photographer Rico Puhlmann. In 1978, he met French-born Eric Domege, who was studying marketing at the Academie Commerciale Internationale (A.C.I.) at the time, in Paris. The pair met again in New York, and in 1983 they founded Optical Affairs.

Personal life
Roth married his partner, Eric Domege, on January 9, 2015, in Miami Beach, Florida.

The 1990s
Under the names Christian Roth and Optical Affairs, Roth and Domege continued to design eyewear that was depicted on the covers of Fashion publications, ranging from Women's Wear Daily to Vogue. In 1990, Roth and the brand were inducted into the Council of Fashion Designers of America. Roth was the first eyewear designer to join the CFDA.

In 1998, Roth and Domege formed a partnership with the Charmant Group to produce and distribute Christian Roth eyewear worldwide. The Japanese manufacturer helped the Christian Roth brand expand internationally, throughout the U.S., Europe, Middle East and Asia.

2000–Present
In 2002 the pair was honored by the art world with the inclusion of their designs from the 1980s and 1990s in the "Taking Eyeglasses Seriously" exhibition at the Triennale di Milano. From 2000 to 2004, Roth and Domege collaborated with designer Michael Kors on his eyewear collections. The pair has also worked with Karl Lagerfeld on his line of fashion eyewear from 2007 to 2011.

The brand Christian Roth celebrated its 25th anniversary in 2009. The designers released 25 limited edition with monogram, versions of their Series A style. In 2010, Christian Roth ended its 12-year licensing deal with Charmant. and retook control of all its trademarks. In 2011, Christian Roth granted Korean-based eyewear firm BCD Korea, Co. Ltd the license the produce and distribute Christian Roth eyewear throughout Asia . In 2012, Christian Roth and Eric Domege founded the firm Optical Affairs Company and launched their e-commerce destination christian-roth.com during New York's F/W 2013 Fashion Week Women's Wear Daily Fashion Scoop February 13, 2013. On October 6, 2014, The Council of Fashion Designers of America has created a new committee, The Eyewear Designers of the Council of Fashion Designers of America CFDA, (edCFDA), which aims to boost the profile of the eyewear sector. Christian Roth is acting as the group's spokesman. . In 2015, DITA Group acquired Christian Roth Eyewear. .

Kate Moss 1992 Series 4001
The brand Christian Roth reintroduced in Spring 2019 its Series 4001 sunglasses in collaboration with the photographer Stephanie Pfriender Stylander featuring her iconic 1992 images of Kate Moss wearing Roth's Series 4001.

Vision Expo x edCFDA Talent Search 2020
Spearheaded by Christian Roth, supported by Vision Expo and the Eyewear Designers of the Council of Fashion Designers of America (edCFDA), the Talent Search 2020 aims to identify and support emerging eyewear designers and foster their talent during the symbolic year for the eyewear industry, 2020.

F1
Christian Roth is the official sunglasses supplier of Haas F1 Team Driver Romain Grosjean

See also
Gentle Monster
Ray-Ban

References

External links 

CFDA
Women’s Wear Daily
Women’s Wear Daily
Women's Wear Daily

Eyewear brands
Eyewear people
1959 births
Living people
German fashion designers
American fashion designers
LGBT fashion designers
Fashion accessory brands
Luxury brands
High fashion brands
1980s fashion
1990s fashion
2000s fashion
2010s fashion